The Standard Insurance-Navy Corvettes are a professional women's volleyball club currently playing in the Philippine Superliga (PSL). The team is owned by Standard Insurance Company, Inc., in partnership with the official women's volleyball team of the Philippine Navy. It debuted in the 2016 Beach Volleyball Challenge Cup.

Aside from volleyball, Standard Insurance also sponsored the Philippine Navy's cycling team. The cycling team has competed in different local cycling competitions such as Ronda Pilipinas.

Honors

Team

References

Women's volleyball teams in the Philippines
Philippine Super Liga
2016 establishments in the Philippines
Volleyball clubs established in 2016
Military sports clubs in the Philippines